Astroworld is the third studio album by American rapper Travis Scott. It was released on August 3, 2018, through Cactus Jack Records and Grand Hustle Records, and distributed by Epic Records. The album follows his second studio album Birds in the Trap Sing McKnight (2016), and his collaborative album Huncho Jack, Jack Huncho (2017) with Quavo.

The album features guest vocals from The Weeknd, Kid Cudi, Frank Ocean, Drake, James Blake, Philip Bailey, 21 Savage, Swae Lee, Gunna, Nav, Quavo, Takeoff, Juice Wrld, Sheck Wes, and Don Toliver, among others. Production was handled by multiple producers, including Scott himself, Mike Dean, Allen Ritter, Hit-Boy, WondaGurl, Tay Keith, Tame Impala, Frank Dukes, Sonny Digital, Murda Beatz, and Thundercat.

The album title is named after the defunct theme park Six Flags AstroWorld, which was located in Houston, Texas prior to its closure. Scott, a Houston native, aimed for the album to sound like "taking an amusement park away from kids". He also described the album as a continuation of his debut album Rodeo (2015). Astroworld is a hip hop and psychedelic rap album, incorporating elements of trap and psychedelic music. The album was supported by four singles, "Butterfly Effect", "Sicko Mode", "Yosemite", and "Wake Up".

Astroworld received widespread acclaim and performed well commercially, debuting atop the US Billboard 200 with 537,000 album-equivalent units, of which 270,000 were pure sales. It was certified triple platinum by the Recording Industry Association of America (RIAA). It won Album of the Year at the 2019 BET Hip Hop Awards. The album was named one of the best albums of 2018 and the decade by several publications.

Background 
The title of the album was announced in May 2016, and initially teased for a 2017 release. The album title is named after the defunct theme park Six Flags AstroWorld, which was located in Houston, Texas prior to its closure in 2005. In a 2017 interview with GQ, Scott spoke on the title of the album: "They tore down AstroWorld to build more apartment space. That's what it's going to sound like, like taking an amusement park away from kids. We want it back. We want the building back. That's why I'm doing it. It took the fun out of the city." Scott described the album as a continuation of his debut album, Rodeo (2015), stating: "My whole idea was, if you locked into Rodeo, you definitely locked into Astroworld. I'm just finishing the saga I started on my first album. This is supposed to be my second album. I had to go quick, because like I said, I had all these ideas, I just had to get off real quick, but now I'm finally back home with Astroworld."

Recording 
Recording for the album took place between 2016 and 2018, with Travis Scott posting updates through social media. In July 2018, it was reported that Scott was completing the album in Hawaii with a variety of recording artists and producers, such as Mike Dean, Nav, Frank Dukes, Sonny Digital, WondaGurl, Sheck Wes, Gunna, Wheezy, Don Toliver, Allen Ritter and Amir "Cash" Esmailian.

Composition 
Astroworld is a hip hop and psychedelic rap album, incorporating elements of trap and psychedelic music. "Stargazing" has been described as a "psychedelic trap" song, while "Coffee Bean" is said to inhabit "old school hip hop territory with a blissed-out funk guitar". The song "Skeletons" has been labelled as "kaleidoscope-pop" by Pitchfork that draws lyrical influences from Kanye West.

Artwork 
The cover was shot by American photographer David LaChapelle, and features a giant golden inflatable of Scott's head as the entrance to an amusement park, with children, parents, and park employees in front of it. A second cover features the same amusement park entrance at nighttime, replacing the family-friendly features with adult-themed content. On August 1, 2018, transgender model Amanda Lepore, who is a known collaborator with LaChapelle, questioned why she had been excluded on the final version of the second cover. LaChapelle later responded, stating that it was due to Lepore upstaging the other models on the cover. Travis Scott would also respond via Twitter, explaining he had "nothing but respect for the LGBTQ community".

In September 2018, TMZ reported that featured artist Frank Ocean filed a cease and desist against Scott to have his verse on "Carousel" removed due to disagreements over the song's sound. Ocean soon issued a clarification, stating: "I think the song sounds cool [...] I also approved it before it came out so the cease and desist wasn't about 🔊 it was about 🏳️🌈. Me and Travis resolved it amongst ourselves weeks ago. 💖" Ocean's use of the pride flag was seen to be a reference to the controversial removal of Lepore from the cover.

Release and promotion 
In May 2017, Scott uploaded three songs to SoundCloud—"A Man", "Green and Purple" featuring Playboi Carti, and "Butterfly Effect". "Butterfly Effect" was released on May 15, 2017, for streaming and digital download as the album's lead single. It peaked at number 50 on the US Billboard Hot 100. The single, "Watch" featuring Kanye West and Lil Uzi Vert, was released on May 4, 2018. The song peaked at number 16 on the Billboard Hot 100.

On July 27, 2018, a giant sculpture of Scott's head appeared on top of an Amoeba Music store in Los Angeles. Multiple copies of the sculpture appeared in various other locations, including Scott's hometown of Houston, Texas. After significant internet speculation, the release date for Astroworld was announced on July 30, 2018, through social media, alongside an album trailer, which featured the track "Stargazing".

The release was followed by an episode of Wav Radio on Beats 1 with Chase B. Three songs were premiered that did not make the final track listing: "Houdini" featuring Playboi Carti, "Zoom" featuring Gunna, and "Part Time". A music video for the song "Stop Trying to Be God" was released on August 6, 2018, directed by Dave Meyers. Scott performed a medley of three songs at the 2018 MTV Video Music Awards.

"Sicko Mode" was sent to rhythmic and urban contemporary radio on August 21, 2018, as the album's second single. It peaked at number one on the Billboard Hot 100. "Yosemite" was sent to urban contemporary radio on November 20, 2018, as the album's third single. The album's fourth single, "Wake Up", was sent to rhythmic contemporary radio on March 26, 2019.

Critical reception 

Astroworld was met with widespread critical acclaim. At Metacritic, which assigns a normalized rating out of 100 to reviews from professional publications, the album received an average score of 85, based on 19 reviews. Aggregator AnyDecentMusic? gave it 8.1 out of 10, based on their assessment of the critical consensus.

Jordan Bassett of NME gave Astroworld a perfect rating, praising the album's guest appearances and noting "Stop Trying to Be God" as "a record of extraordinary prowess", while describing "Coffee Bean" as "a moment that encapsulates the scope and ambition of Astroworld". Bassett concluded: "This is the sound of a musician who has worked to forge an entire world, an empire, around himself – we can peer in, but from afar, guessing at his motives and life behind the velvet rope." With similar acclaim, Kassandra Guagliardi of Exclaim! concluded that Astroworld "shows the evolution of Travis Scott as an artist and is his most refined, imaginative, and rage-worthy project yet". Roisin O'Connor of The Independent described Astroworld as "a futuristic record with virtually flawless production, that lingers on the mind long after the final track" and labelled it Scott's "most career-defining work to date". For Consequence, Wren Graves wrote that Astroworld is "an album full of infectious flows and atmospheric beats". Thomas Hobbs of Highsnobiety stated that Astroworld "will be remembered as the moment Travis Scott produced a piece of music worthy of the riots he is capable of inducing. It's a wildly entertaining circus ride. Travis Scott desperately needed a great album to justify the hype, and with Astroworld, he just might have a classic". Grant Rindner of The Line of Best Fit saying "Scott could have easily made another distorted, debaucherous project like his previous two albums, but by emphasizing his vocal performances and finding the best middle ground he ever has with his bevy of superstar collaborators, he's made Astroworld a theme park worth revisiting whether you came in as a stan or a skeptic".

Larry Fitzmaurice of Pitchfork labelled Astroworld as Scott's strongest album to date, stating that "his skill as a curator helps sculpt a sticky, humid, psychedelic world with dazzling production and odd pleasures at every turn", although considered Scott to "play ringmaster to his neon-decayed circus of sound rather than become the main attraction". Andrew Barker of Variety said, "At 17 tracks, Astroworld is not without filler—the 21 Savage feature "NC-17" is tiresomely sophomoric, while "Can't Say" and "Houstonfornication" never really take shape—but rarely does the album feel lazy or uninspired". For Rolling Stone, Christopher R. Weingarten complimented the first half of the album, though considered the second half to be weaker in comparison: "Unfortunately, Scott doesn't keep the envelope pushing up for the whole album: a seven-song stretch in the back end is vintage Travis with its zoned-out, hypnotic throb. However, the rest marks the most interesting music of his career, Scott no longer just looking the part of a brilliant artist, but sounding like it too."

Rankings

Industry awards

Commercial performance 
In Travis Scott's home country of the United States, Astroworld debuted at number one on the Billboard 200 with 537,000 album-equivalent units, which included 270,000 pure album sales. The album scored the second-largest first week of the year, behind Scorpion by Drake, and second-largest pure album sales week of the year, behind Dave Matthews Band's Come Tomorrow. The album earned 349.43 million streams in the first week, marking the fifth largest streaming week ever. It serves as Scott's second number-one album in the United States. Following the release, all 17 tracks on the album entered the US Billboard Hot 100, including "Sicko Mode" (at 4) and "Stargazing" (8), which made Scott the fourth act to have debuted multiple songs in the chart's top 10 simultaneously. The album earned 205,000 album-equivalent units in the second week, staying at number one. On December 3, 2018, Astroworld returned to the number-one spot on the Billboard 200, earning 71,000 album-equivalent units, almost four months after its initial release. By the end of 2018, the album has earned over 1,985,000 album-equivalent units in the US, with over 464,000 being pure sales, marking the second best-selling hip hop in pure album sales of the year, behind only Eminem's Kamikaze. On November 25, 2019, Astroworld was certified triple platinum by the Recording Industry Association of America (RIAA) with three million album-equivalent units in the United States.

In Australia, Astroworld opened atop the ARIA Albums Chart, becoming Travis Scott's first number-one on the chart. Two tracks "Sicko Mode" (at 7) and "Stargazing" (10) charted in the top ten of the ARIA Singles Chart, marking the rapper's first top ten songs in the country. In Canada, Astroworld moved 27,000 album-equivalent units in its opening week. It serves as Scott's first number-one album in the country. In the second week, the album earned 13,000 album-equivalent units, marking the second straight week at the top of the Billboard Canadian Albums. In the United Kingdom, the album debuted at number three on the UK Albums Chart, becoming the rapper's first top ten album on the chart. As well as the album, the three tracks "Sicko Mode" (at 9), "Stargazing" (15), and "Carousel" (29) charted in the top 40 of the UK Singles Chart, while the lead single "Butterfly Effect" previously reached number 57 on the chart.

Track listing 

Notes
  signifies a co-producer
  signifies an additional producer
 All tracks are stylized in all caps. For example, "Sicko Mode" is stylized as "SICKO MODE".
 "Carousel" features vocals by Frank Ocean, and uncredited vocals by Big Tuck
 "Sicko Mode" features vocals by Drake, and additional vocals by Swae Lee and Big Hawk
 "R.I.P. Screw" features vocals by Swae Lee
 "Stop Trying to Be God" features vocals by Philip Bailey of Earth, Wind & Fire and James Blake, and additional vocals by Kid Cudi and BJ the Chicago Kid
 "No Bystanders" features vocals by Sheck Wes, and additional vocals by Juice Wrld
 "Skeletons" features vocals by Tame Impala, and additional vocals by The Weeknd and Pharrell
 "Wake Up" features vocals by The Weeknd
 "NC-17" features vocals by 21 Savage
 "Yosemite" features vocals by Gunna, and additional vocals by Nav
 "Can't Say" features vocals by Don Toliver
 "Who? What!" features vocals by Quavo and Takeoff

Sample credits
 "Carousel" contains a sample of "The New Style" as performed by the Beastie Boys, written by Rick Rubin, Adam Horovitz, Adam Yauch and Michael Diamond.
 "Sicko Mode" contains a sample of "I Wanna Rock" as performed by Luke, written by Luther Campbell, Harry Wayne Casey and Richard Finch; and "Gimme the Loot" as performed by The Notorious B.I.G., written by Christopher Wallace, Osten Harvey, Bryan Higgins, Trevor Smith, James Jackson, Malik Taylor, Keith Elam, Christopher Martin, Kamaal Fareed, Ali Shaheed Jones-Muhammad, Tyrone Taylor, Fred Scruggs, Kirk Jones and Chylow Parker.
 "No Bystanders" contains a sample of "Jóga" as performed by Björk, written by Björk Guðmundsdóttir and Sigurjón Sigurdsson; and portions of "Tear Da Club Up", written by Paul Beauregard, Ricky Dunigan, Jordan Houston, Lola Mitchell, Darnell Carlton and Robert Phillips.
 "5% Tint" contains a sample of "Cell Therapy" performed by Goodie Mob, written by Rico Wade, Patrick Brown, Ray Murray, Cameron Gipp, Willie Knighton, Robert Barnett and Thomas Callaway.

Personnel 
Credits adapted from the album's liner notes.

Musicians
 Mike Dean – keyboards (track 4), guitar (track 17), synthesizer (track 17)
 Stevie Wonder – harmonica (track 5)
 John Mayer – guitar (tracks 8, 11, 13)
 Sheldon Ferguson – guitar (track 12)
 Nineteen85 – bass (track 17)
 Isaiah Gage – cello (track 17)
 Tim Suby – guitar (track 17)
 Stephen "Johan" Feigenbaum – strings (track 17)

Technical
 Mike Dean – mastering (all tracks), mixing (tracks 1–13, 16, 17), recording (track 8)
 Jimmy Cash – assistant engineer (tracks 1–13, 16, 17), recording (tracks 1, 4, 9–14, 17), mixing (tracks 6, 14)
 Jon Sher – assistant engineer (tracks 1, 3, 16, 17)
 Ben Sedano – assistant engineer (tracks 1, 3, 14, 16, 17)
 Sean Solymor – assistant engineer (tracks 1–13, 16, 17)
 Zach Steele – recording (tracks 2, 5, 12, 13, 17), mixing (track 6)
 Travis Scott – recording (tracks 2–4, 7–11, 16), mixing (tracks 3–5, 7, 8, 11, 17)
 Skyler McLean – assistant engineer (tracks 6, 12, 13)
 Shin Kamiyama – recording (track 8)
 Thomas Cullison – assistant engineer (track 15)
 Blake Harden – mixing (track 15), recording (track 15)

Charts

Weekly charts

Year-end charts

Decade-end charts

Certifications

Release history

References 

2018 albums
Albums produced by Allen Ritter
Albums produced by BadBadNotGood
Albums produced by Boi-1da
Albums produced by Cardo
Albums produced by Cubeatz
Albums produced by FKi (production team)
Albums produced by Frank Dukes
Albums produced by Hit-Boy
Albums produced by Kevin Parker
Albums produced by Mike Dean (record producer)
Albums produced by Murda Beatz
Albums produced by Nineteen85
Albums produced by Sonny Digital
Albums produced by Tay Keith
Albums produced by Thundercat (musician)
Albums produced by TM88
Albums produced by Travis Scott
Albums produced by Vegyn
Albums produced by WondaGurl
Cactus Jack Records albums
Epic Records albums
Grand Hustle Records albums
Travis Scott albums
Grammy Hall of Fame Award recipients
Psychedelic music albums by American artists